Hanneke Mensink is a Dutch former football defender. She played for Quick '20, FC Berghuizen, SV Saestum and Oranje Nassau before retiring in 2008.

She was a member of the Dutch national team.

International goals
Scores and results list the Netherlands goal tally first.

References

1977 births
Living people
Dutch women's footballers
Netherlands women's international footballers
People from Hardenberg
Quick '20 players
Women's association football defenders
SV Saestum players
Footballers from Overijssel
21st-century Dutch women